Actinopus ducke is a species of mygalomorph spider in the family Actinopodidae. It can be found in Brazil.

The specific name ducke refers to the Adolfo Ducke Forest Reserve.

References 

ducke
Spiders described in 2020
Spiders of Brazil